Curry Lane is a hamlet in the parish of Boyton Cornwall, England.

References

Hamlets in Cornwall